Milaca Township is a township in Mille Lacs County, Minnesota, United States. The population was 1,617 at the 2010 census.

Milaca is a truncated form of Mille Lacs Lake.

Geography

Demographics
At the 2000 census, there were 1,189 people, 411 households and 334 families residing in the township. There were 427 housing units at an average density of 13.0/sq mi (5.0/km). The racial makeup of the township was 98.65% White, 0.34% African American, 0.25% Asian, 0.25% from other races, and 0.50% from two or more races. Hispanic or Latino of any race were 0.50% of the population.

There were 411 households, of which 41.6% had children under the age of 18 living with them, 74.0% were married couples living together, 3.4% had a female householder with no husband present, and 18.5% were non-families. 15.1% of all households were made up of individuals, and 7.1% had someone living alone who was 65 years of age or older. The average household size was 2.89 and the average family size was 3.20.

Age distribution was 30.7% under the age of 18, 5.9% from 18 to 24, 29.2% from 25 to 44, 23.3% from 45 to 64, and 10.9% who were 65 years of age or older. The median age was 36 years. For every 100 females, there were 106.1 males. For every 100 females age 18 and over, there were 106.5 males.

The median household income was $45,313, and the median family income was $50,074. Males had a median income of $32,356 versus $24,583 for females. The per capita income for the township was $17,403. About 3.2% of families and 4.5% of the population were below the poverty line, including 2.0% of those under age 18 and 14.2% of those age 65 or over.

References

Townships in Mille Lacs County, Minnesota
Townships in Minnesota